The Rocky River is a  river in the Piedmont region of North Carolina. It begins in Iredell County near Mooresville and flows south into Cabarrus County, where it is the principal waterway in the county.  The river continues southeastward to form the line between Stanly, Union, and Anson counties. It empties into the Pee Dee River just below Norwood, North Carolina at the junction of Stanly, Montgomery, Anson, and Richmond counties, at the foot of the Uwharrie Mountains.

Efforts are being made to boost tourism and canoe and kayak recreation along Rocky River "Blueway"  as part of the Carolina Thread Trail.

Private, non-profit organizations have developed park lands for improved river access, but some controversy ensued.

References

Rivers of Iredell County, North Carolina
Rivers of Cabarrus County, North Carolina
Rivers of Stanly County, North Carolina
Rivers of Union County, North Carolina
Rivers of Anson County, North Carolina
Rivers of Montgomery County, North Carolina
Rivers of Richmond County, North Carolina
Rivers of North Carolina
Tributaries of the Pee Dee River